Darya Safai (born 7 April 1975) is an Iranian-Belgian author, human rights activist, and politician who has been a member of the Belgian Chamber of Representatives for the New Flemish Alliance since 2019.

Early life 
Darya Safai was born in the Iranian capital Tehran, as the oldest child in a family of three girls. After her native country became a strictly conservative Islamic republic after the Iranian Revolution of 1979, she says she experienced feelings of oppression and injustice from an early age. According to her, this spawned the seeds of her women's rights activism. She grew up in Iran after the revolution of 1979.

Student protests 
At the age of 22, Safai married her husband Saeed Bashirtash. She studied dentistry at the University of Tehran. During her final year of college, she took part in student protests in her university in 1999 in response to the revocation of the license of the reformist Iranian newspaper Salam, which quickly grew into a widespread protest against the Iranian regime. On the fourth day of the protests, Safai and her husband, one of the leaders of the protest, led a student rally of hundreds of thousands of people.

However, Ayatollah Khamenei saw the protests as a threat to the Iranian regime and ordered Hassan Rohani, then head of the security services and now former president of Iran, to end the protests. Safai and her husband were on their way back in a car on the fifth day when they were notified by a friend that the security forces had raided their apartment. Her husband fled into the crowd and went into hiding, while she drove to her parents. Two days later, however, Safai was arrested. She was only released from prison on bail after 24 days after posting a large bail. According to Safai, she was probably released because the Iranian regime gambled that she would lead them to her husband in hiding. After her release, she took her final exams. After a few weeks she also secretly came into contact with her hiding husband and together they decided to flee Iran as soon as possible.

Escape to Belgium 
However, Bashirtash was arrested in Turkey by the Turkish authorities, who had plans to exchange him for a Turkish political prisoner. Because Bashirtash had also studied dentistry in Belgium at the ULB, the Belgian government decided to give Bashirtash transit papers, that way Safai and her husband were able to flee to Belgium. After her flight, Safai was sentenced in absentia by an Iranian court to two years in prison.

On June 28, 2000, Safai and her husband landed at Zaventem airport. Safai quickly learned Dutch and French. Because her diploma was not recognized in Belgium, she had to redo her last two years of dentistry at the Vrije Universiteit Brussel. She then founded several dental practices with her husband in Brussels and Antwerp. In 2003 she also acquired Belgian nationality.

Activism
In 2014 she founded the group 'Let Iranian Women Enter Their Stadiums' to strive for the right of Iranian women to attend sport games in stadiums. She uses the stadium ban as a symbol of one of the many discriminations Iranian women are confronted with on a daily basis.

In February 2015, Darya Safai wrote a letter to Sepp Blatter, at that time President of FIFA, about the situation of the Iranian women and what they expected from FIFA.  FIFA does not comply its statutes regarding the Islamic Republic of Iran: Article 3 of FIFA's statutes:

"Discrimination of any kind against a Country, private person or group of people on account of race, skin colour, ethnic, national or social origin, gender, language, religion, political opinion or any other opinion, wealth, birth or any other status, sexual orientation or any other reason is strictly prohibited and punishable by suspension or expulsion."

This letter has been supported and signed by more than 200 prominent Iranian academics, human-, civil- and political activists, political prisoners and artists.

At the 2016 Olympic Games in Rio de Janeiro she showed her banner during the volleyball games of the Iranian men's volleyball team. This action caused a lot of controversy. Olympic officials and security personnel threatened to eject her for holding the banner in front of the cameras. But she didn't go and displayed the sign during different games.

On 2 June 2017 Darya Safai and a fellow activist showed the 'Let Iranian Women Enter Their Stadiums' banner during the Italy-Iran FIVB Volleyball World League match in Pesaro, Italy. Italian police officers allegedly prevented them from performing the demonstration, removed Darya Safai by force from the stadium bleachers, and cut the banner into pieces, while being filmed by at least one bystander. On 4 June 2017 Italian journalist Michele Serra, on his daily column hosted by La Repubblica's front page, urged Italian authorities to issue an official apology in favor of Datya Safai. As of 5 June 2017, no official statement has been made by Italian authorities.

Safai has also campaigned against compulsory hijab laws in Iran, arguing that it represents discrimination and oppression against Iranian women. She is also critical of Western politicians who argue that wearing Islamic veils and headscarves in the West is a matter of religious freedom, equal rights or are a symbol of diversity. Safai states that condoning the headscarf out of tolerance or multiculturalism is a form of cultural relativism and unjustified support for institutionalized discrimination. In 2016, Safai criticized Belgian Mouvement Réformateur senator Christine Defraigne for making an official visit to Iran and for wearing a headscarf while meeting with officials from the Iranian government.

Politics
Due to her women's rights activism, Safai was approached by the Open Vld and New Flemish Alliance parties to run as a candidate. She joined the N-VA in 2018 and stood in the Flemish Brabant region for the party during the 2018 Belgian local elections, but was not elected. During the 2019 Belgian Federal election, Safai stood on the N-VA's list in the Flemish Brabant region and was elected to the Chamber of Representatives.

Books
In October 2015 her book 'Lopen tegen de wind' ('Running against the Wind'), about her life story and her fight against discrimination of Iranian women, was published.
In September 2018 her book 'Plots mocht ik niet meer lachen' ('Suddenly I wasn't allowed to laugh anymore) was published.

Recognition
On 21 March 2016 she received the Ebbenhouten Spoor award for exceptional merit as Flemish newcomer.

In December 2016, she was awarded the title 'Women Of Peace' by the Belgian Secretary of State for Equal Opportunities at the Belgian Senate, for her fight for women's rights.

In October 2022, she gained media attention by cutting her hair, alongside with Belgian foreign minister, Hadja Lahbib, after a speech regarding Iranian protests after Mahsa Amini death.

References 

1975 births
Living people
Iranian activists
Iranian women activists
People from Tehran
Iranian emigrants to Belgium
Iranian dentists
Belgian dentists
New Flemish Alliance politicians
21st-century Belgian politicians
Members of the Chamber of Representatives (Belgium)
Former Muslims turned agnostics or atheists
Former Muslim critics of Islam
Belgian critics of Islam
Belgian deputies of the 55th legislature